The 2016-2017 Granma season was the 40th for the team in the Cuban National Series and was the first season that they won the National Series.

Granma's manager was Carlos Marti Santos.

Roster

Pitchers

Catchers

Infielders

Outfielders

Regular season

Postseason

Team manager Carlos Marti Santos dedicated the win to the memory of Fidel Castro and to the Granma fans.  Alfredo Despaigne Rodriguez (Olympic medalist and player in Japanese and Mexican league baseball) said that the Series win was the greatest moment of his life in baseball.

Notes

References

External links
 BaseballdeCuba.com: 2017 CUBAN FINALS: DESPAIGNE WITH THE GAME WINNER FOR GRANMA. HORSES LEAD THE SERIES 1-0 
 Youtube Channel of CNC Television Granma "Momento épico!. 9no inning, último out, Granma campeón"

Cuban National Series